Charles McLean  (20 September 1892 – 7 March 1965) was a New Zealand rugby union player. A loose forward, McLean represented Buller at a provincial level, and was a member of the New Zealand national side, the All Blacks, in 1920. He played five matches for the All Blacks, scoring seven tries, but did not appear in any internationals.

McLean enlisted for military service in August 1914, and served with the New Zealand Expeditionary Force throughout World War I, including at Gallipoli. A private, he was awarded the Military Medal in 1918, for acts of gallantry in the field.

McLean died in Christchurch on 7 March 1965, and he was buried at Hokitika Cemetery.

References

1892 births
1965 deaths
New Zealand rugby union players
New Zealand international rugby union players
Buller rugby union players
Rugby union flankers
New Zealand military personnel of World War I
New Zealand recipients of the Military Medal
Burials at Hokitika Cemetery